Alrkph is a village in the Republic of Yemen within the Taiz Governorate, Yemen, and administratively attached to Mawiyah District. With a population of 110 people, according to statistics in 2004

Populated places in Taiz Governorate
Villages in Yemen